Korti or Kurti is a town in northern-central Sudan. In the Meroitic period the city appeared as Cadetum, Cadata or Coetum in Roman sources. It is also known for being the centre location for the Shaigiya tribe.

History
In 1881, the Mahdist uprising led to Britain sending in an army in August 1884 under Garnet Wolseley in the so-called Nile Expedition to relieve General Gordon. Korti became a rallying point for British troops. In January 1885 a fort was built by British troops on the north side of the Nile, right in front of Korti. From here, the advance on the Nile and through the desert could take place simultaneously. In the fighting in the Bayuda Desert between Kurti and Metemmeh (on the Nile opposite Shendi) the Madhist Sudanese suffered a defeat in the Battle of Abu Klea soon after the base at Korti was built.

See also 
 List of cities in Sudan
 Subdivisions of Sudan
 Umbukole

References

Populated places in Northern (state)